MS 365 may refer to:

 Mississippi Highway 365
 Microsoft 365